McGuire was a Formula One racing car constructor founded by Australian driver Brian McGuire. The team participated in one Formula One World Championship Grand Prix but failed to qualify.

Brian McGuire first started to race in the British-based Shellsport G8 International Series in 1976, as a private entry with the Formula One-specification Williams FW04.  He also entered the car for the 1976 British Grand Prix but was only listed as a reserve and never made it on to the track. For the 1977 season McGuire made extensive modifications to the Williams and it was entered for the 1977 British Grand Prix as the McGuire BM1. However, the car was uncompetitive in the special pre-qualifying sessions, slower than all the other entrants except Mikko Kozarowitzky who had an accident, and McGuire failed to make it through to the full qualifying sessions. Brian McGuire was killed at the wheel of the car at Brands Hatch later in 1977.

Complete Formula One World Championship results
(key)

References 

Results from Formula1.com
Profile at Grand Prix Encyclopedia

Formula One constructors
Formula One entrants
Australian auto racing teams
Australian racecar constructors